The Carrao Bracho Trophy is given annually to the Venezuelan Professional Baseball League pitcher who has recorded the best individual performance in that year, as voted on by members of the media. 

The award was originally created in 1985 as the VPBL Pitcher of the Year Award, and was renamed Carrao Bracho Trophy since 1995 to honour José Bracho, who spent 26 years in the league. 

Bracho still owns all-time career records in several pitching categories, including most wins, complete games, strikeouts and innings pitched, as well as the record for the most wins in a single-season.

Award winners

Sources
Liga Venezolana de Béisbol Profesional official website (Spanish)

1985 establishments in Venezuela
Awards established in 1985
Venezuelan Professional Baseball League
Venezuelan awards